Pay-ye Tal (also Romanized as Pāy-ye Tal; also known as Pā-ye Tal) is a village in Amjaz Rural District, in the Central District of Anbarabad County, Kerman Province, Iran. At the 2006 census, its population was 14, in 4 families.

References 

Populated places in Anbarabad County